Bojan Puzigaća (born 10 May 1985) is a Bosnian retired professional footballer who played as a left-back.

Honours
Borac Banja Luka
First League of RS: 2016–17
Bosnian Cup: 2009–10

Sarajevo
Bosnian Premier League: 2014–15
Bosnian Cup: 2013–14

Krupa
First League of RS: 2019–20

References

External links

1985 births
Living people
People from Drvar
Serbs of Bosnia and Herzegovina
Bosnia and Herzegovina footballers
Bosnia and Herzegovina expatriate footballers
Expatriate footballers in Poland
Expatriate footballers in Serbia
Bosnia and Herzegovina expatriate sportspeople in Poland
Bosnia and Herzegovina expatriate sportspeople in Serbia
Premier League of Bosnia and Herzegovina players
Ekstraklasa players
I liga players
Serbian SuperLiga players
First League of the Republika Srpska players
FK Borac Banja Luka players
NK Čelik Zenica players
MKS Cracovia (football) players
FK Sarajevo players
FK Voždovac players
FK Krupa players
Association football fullbacks